The Alaskan tundra wolf (Canis lupus tundrarum), also known as the barren-ground wolf, is a North American subspecies of gray wolf native to the barren grounds of the Arctic coastal tundra region. It was named in 1912 by Gerrit Smith Miller Jr., who noted that it closely approaches the Great Plains wolf in skull and tooth morphology, though possessing a narrower rostrum and palate. It is a large, white-colored wolf closely resembling C. l. pambasileus, though lighter in color. This wolf is recognized as a subspecies of Canis lupus in the taxonomic authority Mammal Species of the World (2005).

See also
 Interior Alaskan wolf

References

Subspecies of Canis lupus
Arctic land animals
Mammals of the Arctic
Carnivorans of North America
Fauna of Alaska
Mammals of Canada
Mammals of the United States
Wolves in the United States
Mammals described in 1912